Vana-Vigala is a village in Märjamaa Parish, Rapla County in western Estonia.

Since 2002 a metal festival Hard Rock Laager is held in Vana-Vigala every summer.

Vigala river flows through Vana-Vigala. On the river, there has been appearing natural phenomena known as Ice Circle of Vana-Vigala.

Vana-Vigala Manor
Vana-Vigala estate dates from 1420, when a first, fortified manor house was built in the vicinity of the present building. The present-day building however was erected in 1772–1775. It is built on soft ground and has had to be strengthened on several occasions. In 1858 and 1864, restorations were carried out and the façade changed. During the revolution of 1905, rioters put fire to the house, with heavy damage ensuing, including the loss of the 20,000 volume library. The house was afterwards restored, and by 1914 had regained most of its earlier look. In the 18th century, a romantic park and a deer park was laid out around the manor.

During its almost entire history, the estate belonged to the Uexküll family, who owned the estate from 1420 until 1919, when it was expropriated following Estonia's declaration of independence. The building has subsequently served as different educational institutions.

Images

Notable people
Tarvi Thomberg (born 1982), Estonian wrestler

See also
 List of palaces and manor houses in Estonia

References

Villages in Rapla County
Manor houses in Estonia
Kreis Wiek